Nevoid hypertrichosis is a cutaneous condition characterized by the growth of terminal hairs in a circumscribed area.

See also 
 Onychauxis
 List of cutaneous conditions

References 

Conditions of the skin appendages